The Dunkirk (Leyland) Detachment is a Cadet Battery affiliated with the Royal Artillery within Salerno Company, Lancashire Army Cadets.

Location
This detachment is one of the army cadet branches that are located within the Lancashire town of Leyland, Lancashire at Dunkirk Lane, Leyland, Lancashire. The second detachment Leyland detachment is located at Bent Lane, Leyland Lancashire

Army Cadet Force 
The Army Cadet Force (ACF) is a national youth organisation sponsored by the United Kingdom's Ministry of Defence and the British Army.

Although sponsored by the Ministry of Defence, the ACF is not part of the British Army or Army Reserve, and as such cadets are not subject to military 'call up'. Some cadets do, however, go on to enlist in the armed forces in later life, and many of the organisation's leaders have been cadets or have a military background.

References

British Cadet organisations
Royal Artillery